Tibor Kemeny (5 March 1913 – 25 September 1992) also referred to as Kemeny Tibor, was a Hungarian football player and coach, who played as a forward for Ferencvarosi TC and the Hungarian national team (9 caps). He was part of the team in the 1934 World Cup. He played one match in World Cup, against Austria in the quarter finals (Hungary lost 2-1). With Ferencvaros, he faced Juventus twice in 1938.

As a coach, he managed Ujpest FC in the 1949–50 season, and Olympiacos in 1957–58. With Olympiacos, he celebrated a League title and a Cup, succeeding the double in his only season in the team. He worked the 4-2-4, and with him as coach, Olympiacos played great football, that Marton Bukovi continued when he came to Piraeus.

Kemeny also managed MTK Hungaria in 1955, leading the team to win the Mitropa Cup this season and Zagłębie Sosnowiec.

Titles as a player

Ferencvarosi TC
Hungarian League (5)
1932, 1934, 1938, 1940, 1941
Hungarian Cup (5)
1933, 1935, 1942, 1943, 1944
Mitropa Cup (1)
1937

Titles as a coach

MTK Hungaria
Mitropa Cup (1)
1955

Olympiacos F.C.
Greek League (1)
1958
Greek Cup (1)
1958

References

1913 births
1992 deaths
Footballers from Budapest
1934 FIFA World Cup players
Ferencvárosi TC footballers
Hungarian footballers
Hungarian football managers
Hungary international footballers
Olympiacos F.C. managers
Újpest FC managers
MTK Budapest FC managers
GKS Katowice managers
Zagłębie Sosnowiec managers
Association football forwards
Nemzeti Bajnokság I managers